School on Fire (學校風雲) is a 1988 Hong Kong action film directed by Ringo Lam. The film involves a young schoolgirl Chu Yuen Fong (Fennie Yuen) who becomes caught in a tragic stranglehold of triad activity after she testifies over a triad beating. When this news reaches the triad leader Brother Smart (Roy Cheung), Yuen Fong must pay him protection money for what she has done as events begin to escalate.

Plot

The film involves a young schoolgirl Chu Yuen Fong (Fennie Yuen) who becomes caught in a tragic stranglehold of triad activity after she testifies over a triad beating. When this news reaches the triad leader Brother Smart (Roy Cheung), Yuen Fong must pay him protection money for what she has done as events begin to escalate.

Cast 
 Fennie Yuen Kit-Ying as Chu Yuen Fong
 Sarah Lee Lai-Yu as Sandy Kwok Siu-Chun
 Damian Lau as Wan
 Lam Ching-ying as Brother Hoi
 Roy Cheung as Brother Smart
 Terrence Fok Shui-Wah as Howard / "Scar"
 Joe Chu Kai-Sang as Lau Yong / "Sa-Pei"
 William Ho Ka-Kui as "Happy"
 Victor Hon as Chu Man-hung
 Tommy Wong Kwong-Leung as Chuen Ngor
 Chan Lap-Ban as Sandy's grandmother
 Li Kwong-Tim as Sandy's father
 Cheung Lui as Brother Shing
 Frankie Ng Chi-Hung as Brother Tin-chiu
 Ricky Ho Pui-Tung as George Chow

Uncut Version 
The theatrical version was edited with many scenes censored in order to be released publicly in both Hong Kong and Taiwan. The uncut version can be only found on the Tai Seng VHS Video Release from Rainbow Audio & Video Co.

Awards
The film won actress Sarah Lee the award for Best Supporting Actress at the 8th Hong Kong Film Awards.

Notes

External links

 

1988 films
1980s action thriller films
1980s crime thriller films
Films directed by Ringo Lam
Hong Kong action thriller films
Hong Kong crime thriller films
Triad films
1980s high school films
1980s Cantonese-language films
Films set in Hong Kong
Films shot in Hong Kong
1980s Hong Kong films